7221 series was a diesel motor railbus on Croatian Railways.

This series was used on branch lines with low traffic. This series was very economic. Unfortunately, it was (by today's standards) very uncomfortable. The motor was very loud when running at higher speeds.

This series was conceived to be modular. It was possible to couple motor units and unpowered cars together, and drive them centrally as one train unit. This was rarely used, when there was demand on lines.

It is very similar to and derives from the German Schienenbus.

Curiosity 

There also exists a special version of this vehicle. It is painted blue and is used as a track measure train. It is located in Zagreb, on "Ranžirni Kolodvor" and used occasionally to monitor track on branch lines.

External links
Details

7221
Train-related introductions in 1955
1955 in rail transport